Korea Racing Authority (KRA) is a public company established to manage the racehorse breeding industry in South Korea.

It was founded in 1922 as the Chosun Horse Racing Club, and was later renamed.

Facilities
 LetsRun Park (racecourse and park)
 LetsRun Park Seoul
 LetsRun Park Busan–Gyeongnam
 LetsRun Park Jeju
 LetsRun Farm
 Wondand Farm
 LetsRun Jeju
 LetsRun Jangsu
 Museum
 Korea Racing Authority Equine Museum
 Off-track betting
 LetsRun CCC

External links
 

Horse racing organizations
Horse racing in South Korea
Sports governing bodies in South Korea
Government-owned companies of South Korea
Gwacheon